Aston-By-Stone is a village near the A34 road, south of the town of Stone, in the civil parish of Stone Rural, in the Stafford district, in the English county of Staffordshire. Circa 1870, it had a population of 625 as recorded in the Imperial Gazetteer of England and Wales. Aston was recorded in the Domesday Book as Estone. Aston-by-Stone railway station closed in 1947.

References

External links 
 Aerial photos of Aston-By-Stone
 

Villages in Staffordshire
Borough of Stafford